Thüren is a Surname

Thüren is a lake in the Mecklenburgische Seenplatte district in Mecklenburg-Vorpommern, Germany. At an elevation of 62.1 m, its surface area is 1.72 km².

Lakes of Mecklenburg-Western Pomerania